Carpegna may refer to:

 Carpegna, an Italian noble family started by Guido I Carpegna in the XIII century

Places 
 Carpegna, a comune (municipality) in the Province of Pesaro e Urbino, Italy
 Monte Carpegna, a mountain at the border of the Province of Rimini with the Province of Pesaro and Urbino, region of Marche, Italy

People 
 Daniel Varela Suanzes-Carpegna (born 1951), Spanish politician and former Member of the EU Parliament
 Gasparo di Carpegna (1661-1733), great-grandnephew of Michelangelo Buonarroti, Florentine official at the court of Cosimo III
 Gaspare Carpegna (1625–1714), Italian Roman Catholic Cardinal
 Gabrielli di Carpegna (1856-1924), Italian nobleman, politician and soldier
 Massimo Carpegna (born 1955), Italian conductor
 Pietro Carpegna, or Petrus de Carpinea (1592–1630), Italian Roman Catholic Bishop of Gubbio
 Ulderico Carpegna (1595–1679), Italian jurist and Cardinal of the Roman Catholic Chirch

Buildings 
 Palazzo Carpegna, former seat of the Academy of St Luke, located in Rome, Italy
 San Pio V a Villa Carpegna, a Titular Church in the Roman Catholic Church, located in Rome, Italy